Lifesavers Underground (a.k.a. LSU, and L.S. Underground) was one of many Michael Knott projects. The band formed in 1986 and combined elements of an earlier Knott project called Idle Lovell and LSU's sunnier alter ego Lifesavers.

Lifesavers Underground combined elements of punk, post punk, funk, hard rock, and other forms of music. In 1987 Lifesavers Underground released their debut album, Shaded Pain. This was followed in 1989 with Wakin' Up the Dead.

1991 saw the release of This Is the Healing, utilising a drum machine and Knott playing most of the musical instruments.  The Grape Prophet (1993) was the first of rock operas by Knott. 

Released in 1993, the fifth album was Cash in Chaos: World Tour. At this point Knott announced that he was changing the name of LSU to 'Cash in Chaos' (hence the mixed band name for this release).  

1994's Grace Shaker was followed in 1998 by Dogfish Jones, another rock opera. 

Despite inactivity from the LSU moniker in recent years, Knott announced in August 2008 that he has recorded a new album with Josh Lory, Jim Chaffin from the Crucified, Matt Biggers, Daniel Sonner and others.

Discography
Us Kids - The Lifesavors, 1981 (MRC)(Re-released on M8 Records in 2000, with the bonus album "My Life" added on.)
Dream Life - The Lifesavors, 1983 (Refuge)
A Kiss of Life - Lifesavers, 1986 (Frontline)
Shaded Pain - Lifesavers Underground, 1987 (Frontline Records)
Wakin' Up The Dead - Lifesavers Underground, 1989 (Blonde Vinyl)
This Is The Healing - Lifesavers Underground, 1991 (Blonde Vinyl), Review: Cornerstone
Poplife - Lifesavers, 1991 (Blonde Vinyl)
The Grape Prophet - L.S. Underground, 1992 (Blonde Vinyl)
Cash in Chaos: World Tour - LSU, 1993 (Siren Records)
Grace Shaker - LSU, 1994 (Alarma Records)
Huntington Beach - Lifesavers, 1995 (Brainstorm Artists, Intl), Review: HM Magazine
Bring It Down Now - LSU, 1995 (Gray Dot)
Dogfish Jones - LSU, 1998 (Light)
Definitive Collection - LSU (and solo Michael Knott), 1998 (KMG), Review: HM Magazine
Live at Cornerstone '91 and '93, Volumes 1 and 2 - LSU, 2000
PTSD - L.S. Underground, 2010

Several bootlegs have appeared including 3-14-81 and The Nashville Demos from the early 80s. Much like Knott, Krischak has released several projects since the demise of Lifesavers including Generation XXX (2000) and Sci Fi Music Madness (2005).

References

External links
XCHAKS Official Website
gray dot profile

American post-punk music groups
Christian punk groups
Christian rock groups from California
American gothic rock groups
Musical groups established in 1986
1986 establishments in California